Henry Liston (30 June 1771 – 24 February 1836) was a Scottish minister and inventor.

Life
Born on 30 June 1771, he was the oldest son of Robert Liston, minister of Aberdour, Fife. He studied for the ministry and in 1793 became minister to the parish of Ecclesmachan, Linlithgowshire, and was clerk of its presbytery and in 1820 he became conjunct clerk of the synod of Lothian and Tweeddale.

Liston died suddenly on 24 February 1836 at Merchison Hall, Falkirk.

Works
Liston invented a special pipe organ he called the "Euharmonic Organ." It had a tuning with 58 pitches in the space of an octave for performing music in just intonation and was championed by John Farey, Sr., who also directed attention to instruments developed for similar purposes by David Loeschman and William Hawkes. Liston used a series of pedals to change the pitch assigned to the keys of an ordinary keyboard, changing sharps and flats, as well as raising or lowering pitches by a major comma as required by the key of the music being performed. The first instrument was built in Edinburgh and had a separate pipe for each pitch. The second instrument was built by Flight and Robson in London, and used moveable shaders close to the mouth of the pipes in order to lower their pitch temporarily by one or two commas which reduced its cost and size, and with an improved bellows the system was the subject of a patent granted to Liston and Charles Broughton on 3 July 1810. After introducing the instrument in a session at the builder's showrooms in 1811, Liston published his "Essay on Perfect Intonation" (Edinburgh, 1812) describing its tuning, construction and operation along with a treatise on music theory and 40 pages of music .

Liston also patented an improved plough on 23 September 1813, claiming a special shape and an inclined wheel, which was locally used. He wrote the article "Music" for the Edinburgh Encyclopedia, and edited 'Horatii Flacei Opera Selecta' (1819) and the sixth book of Caesar for use in schools.

Family
Liston married Margaret Ireland on 21 October 1793, and was father to the famous surgeon Robert Liston  and David Liston, professor of oriental languages at Edinburgh.

Bibliography
 "Euharmonic Organ" (1830) Edinburgh Encyclopedia. William Blackwood, Edinburgh.

References 

Scottish inventors
1771 births
1836 deaths
19th-century Ministers of the Church of Scotland
Scottish encyclopedists
18th-century Ministers of the Church of Scotland
People from Aberdour
Scottish musical instrument makers